José Fernando Bulnes Zelaya (born 21 October 1946) a.k.a. Azulejo, is a retired Honduran football defender who played for Honduras in the 1982 FIFA World Cup.

Club career
Nicknamed Azulejo, Bulnes made his senior debut at 17 and played for Atlético Español, Universidad and Olimpia. He spent a record 20 years with Olimpia in the Honduran national league before retiring in 1985.

International career
Bulnes played for Honduras in the 1960s, 70s and 1980s and represented his country in 12 FIFA World Cup qualification matches and played two games at the 1982 FIFA World Cup at the age of 35.

His final international was the June 1982 World Cup Finals match against Yugoslavia.

Honours and awards

Club
C.D. Olimpia
Liga Profesional de Honduras (7):  1966–67, 1967–68, 1969–70, 1971–72, 1977–78, 1982–83, 1984–85,

References

External links
 Fernando Bulnes, Luis Cruz, Remberto Jordán Roca - La Prensa 
 Fernando “El azulejo” Bulnes - El Heraldo 

1946 births
Living people
People from Comayagua Department
Association football defenders
Honduran footballers
Honduras international footballers
1982 FIFA World Cup players
C.D. Olimpia players
CONCACAF Championship-winning players